Horton Hears a Who! is a 1954 book by Dr. Seuss.

Horton Hears a Who! may also refer to:

 Horton Hears a Who! (film), a 2008 animated film adaptation of the book
 Horton Hears a Who! (TV special), a 1970 TV special based on the book